Possumwood may refer to various trees:

 Diospyros virginiana (American persimmon), in warm-temperate North America
 Hura crepitans (sandbox tree), in the tropical Americas
 Quintinia sieberi, a rainforest tree of eastern Australia